Fredrik Händemark (born August 27, 1993) is a Swedish professional ice hockey player currently under contract with Malmö Redhawks  of the Swedish Hockey League (SHL).

Playing career
Undrafted, Händemark made his Swedish Hockey League debut playing with Leksands IF during the 2013–14 SHL season.

After serving as captain for three seasons with the Malmö Redhawks of the SHL, Händemark signed with the San Jose Sharks of the National Hockey League on May 4, 2020.

On August 10, 2020, Händemark agreed to return and continue his tenure with the Redhawks on loan from the Sharks until the commencement of the delayed 2020–21 North American season. He made his NHL debut on January 18, 2021, in a 4–5 loss to the St. Louis Blues. He scored his first NHL goal on March 12, 2021 in a 6–0 win against the Anaheim Ducks at the Honda Center. In 8 games with the Sharks, Händemark finished with a lone goal, primarily assigned to the club's taxi squad.

As an impending free agent from the Sharks, Händemark left the club after one season by agreeing to a two-year contract with Russian club, SKA Saint Petersburg of the KHL, on 17 June 2021 but he returned to Sweden on October 15 and joined Malmö Redhawks.

Career statistics

References

External links

1993 births
Living people
Borlänge HF players
Swedish expatriate ice hockey players in the United States
Leksands IF players
Malmö Redhawks players
IK Pantern players
People from Gagnef Municipality
San Jose Barracuda players
San Jose Sharks players
SKA Saint Petersburg players
Swedish ice hockey centres
Undrafted National Hockey League players
Sportspeople from Dalarna County